Iran competed at the 2016 Summer Paralympics in Rio de Janeiro, Brazil, from 7 September to 18 September 2016.

Competitors

Medalists

| width="77%" align="right" valign="top" |

| width="23%" align="left" valign="top" |

The death of Para-cyclist
Iranian Para-cyclist Bahman Golbarnezhad has died following an accident during men's C4/C5 road race at the Rio 2016 Paralympics. He was involved in a serious crash on Saturday (17 September) and sustained severe injuries to his neck. The 48-year-old rider received emergency treatment at the scene before being transported to hospital where he succumbed to his injuries. Following Golbarnezhad's passing, the Iranian flag has been lowered to half-mast in the Paralympic Village. The Paralympic flag will also be flown at half-mast in the Paralympic Village and at the Riocentro venue, where Iran played Bosnia and Herzegovina in the sitting volleyball gold medal match on Sunday (18 September).

Disability classifications

Every participant at the Paralympics has their disability grouped into one of five disability categories; amputation, the condition may be congenital or sustained through injury or illness; cerebral palsy; wheelchair athletes, there is often overlap between this and other categories; visual impairment, including blindness; Les autres, any physical disability that does not fall strictly under one of the other categories, for example dwarfism or multiple sclerosis. Each Paralympic sport then has its own classifications, dependent upon the specific physical demands of competition. Events are given a code, made of numbers and letters, describing the type of event and classification of the athletes competing. Some sports, such as athletics, divide athletes by both the category and severity of their disabilities, other sports, for example swimming, group competitors from different categories together, the only separation being based on the severity of the disability.

Archery

Iran earned a spot in archery at both the 2016 Olympic and Paralympic Games at the 2015 Asian Archery Championships as a result of performance of Zahra Nemati at the event. She also carried the Iranian flag into the Olympic opening ceremony. Should she compete in both, she will be the first archer to do so since Italy's Paola Fantato did this at the 1996 Summer Paralympics. She took up the sport in 2006, two years after a spinal-cord injury that occurred during an accident. Prior to that, she competed in taekwondo where she had a black belt. Six months after taking up the sport, she won the Iranian national championships. She competed at the 2011 Archery World Championships, and set four world records at the Italy hosted event. She will go to Rio as a defending Paralympic gold medalist in the women's individual recurve W1/W2, and bronze medalist in the women's team recurve open. She also won gold at the 2013 World Championships in Bangkok, Thailand. She also won a bronze medal at the same event.

Men

|-
|align=left|Golamreza Rahimi
|align=left rowspan=2|Individual recurve open
|624
|5
|align="center"|W 6–2
|align="center"|W 6–0
|align="center"|W 6–2
|align="center"|W 6–4
|align="center"|W 7–3
|align="center" |
|-
|align=left|Ebrahim Ranjbar
|637
|1
|align="center"|W 6–2
|align="center"|W 6–4
|align="center"|W 7–3
|align="center"|L 6–4
|align="center"|W 7–1
| align="center" |
|-
|align=left|Majid Kakoosh
|align=left|Individual compound W1
|628
|7
|
|align="center"| W 131–129
|align="center"| L 144–124
|align=center colspan="4" |Did not advance
|-
|align=left|Hadi Nori
|align=left|Individual compound open
|685
|3
|align="center"|W 136–126
|align="center"|L 138–134
|align=center colspan="4" |Did not advance
|-
|}

Women

|-
|align=left|Mohadeseh Kohansal
|align=left rowspan=2|Individual recurve open
|541
|24
|align="center"|W 6–2
|align="center"|L 0–6
|align=center colspan="4" |Did not advance
|-
|align=left|Zahra Nemati
|627
|2
|align="center"|W 6–0
|align="center"|W 6–0
|align="center"|W 6–4
|align="center"|W 6–0
|align="center"|W 6–4
|align="center" |
|-
|align=left|Somayeh Abbaspour
|align=left|Individual compound open
|657
|2
|align=center|Bye
|align="center"|W 140–129
|align="center"|W 137–136
|align="center"|L 137–129
|align="center"|L 140–138
|4
|-
|}

Mixed

Athletics

The following 24 men and 3 woman will represent Iran at 2016 Summer Paralympics. A total of 27 athletes will compete for Iran at the 2016 Summer Paralympics.

Men

Track

Field

Women

Cycling

With one pathway for qualification being one highest ranked NPCs on the UCI Para-Cycling male and female Nations Ranking Lists on 31 December 2014, Iran qualified for the 2016 Summer Paralympics in Rio, assuming they continued to meet all other eligibility requirements.

5-a-side football

Iran qualified for the Paralympics after finishing first at the 2015 IBSA Blind Football Asian Championships. Iran opened round robin play 5–0 win against Malaysia. Next, they drew 0–0 with Japan. Their third game saw them crush India 10–0. They then drew 0–0 with China. Their last game of group play was a 4–0 win against South Korea. Their win put them second in round robin play. They met China in a single placement final, which they won in a 1–0 penalty shootout. Iran's Ahmadreza Shahhosseini was given the tournament's Golden Boot as the tournament's top scorer. The team was coached by Javad Felfeli with Mohammadreza Shaddelbasir the team's guide.

Semi-final

Gold medal match

7-a-side football
Iran qualified for the 2016 Rio Games following the suspension of Russia. The IPC ruled that there could not be a redraw for the groups. This resulted in Iran being put into Group A with the Netherlands, Argentina and the United States.

Iran goes to Rio as reigning 2008 and 2012 Paralympic bronze medalists. They had missed out on qualification for Rio initially because they had visa issues that did not allow them to participate in the IFCPF World Championships, and there were not enough teams to allow for a viable Asian qualifying competition. The IFCPF said in their rationale for picking Iran that it would increase continental inclusion from 2 to 3, and they would be replacing one potential medalist with another potential medalist. Iran goes into the tournament ranked 12th in the world.

Judo

Paracanoeing

Iran earned a qualifying spot at the 2016 Summer Paralympics in this sport following their performance at the 2015 ICF Canoe Sprint & Paracanoe World Championships in Milan, Italy where the top six finishers in each Paralympic event earned a qualifying spot for their nation. Shahla Behrouzirad earned the spot for Iran after finishing sixth in the women's KL3 event.

Women

Powerlifting

Siamand Rahman worked on qualifying for the 2016 Games at the 2015 IPC Powerlifting Asian Open Championships. Competing in the men's over 107 kg event, he set a new world record of 295 kg on his way to winning gold.

Shooting

The first opportunity to qualify for shooting at the Rio Games took place at the 2014 IPC Shooting World Championships in Suhl. Shooters earned spots for their NPC. Iran earned a qualifying spot at this event in the P2 – 10m Air Pistol Women SH1 event as a result of Sareh Javanmardi winning a gold medal.

The country sent shooters to 2015 IPC IPC Shooting World Cup in Osijek, Croatia, where Rio direct qualification was also available. They earned a qualifying spot at this event based on the performance of Samira Eram in the P2 – 10m Air Pistol Women SH1 event. Because no woman qualified based on the criteria in P3 – 25m Pistol Mixed SH1 event at this competition, an extra spot on the women's side was given in the P4 – 50m Pistol Mixed SH1. Iran's Alieh Mahmoudi acquired this spot for her country.

The third opportunity for direct qualification for shooters to the Rio Paralympics took place at the 2015 IPC IPC Shooting World Cup in Sydney, Australia. At this competition, Mahdi Zamani earned a qualifying spot for their country in the P1- Men's 10m Air Pistol SH1 event. Masoumeh Khodabakhshi earned another qualifying spot for Iran in the R4- Mixed 10m Air Rifle Standing SH2 event.

Swimming

Sitting volleyball

Men
Iran men's national sitting volleyball team qualified for the 2016 Games at the World Championships. Iran men's national sitting volleyball team were also in the qualification run for the 2016 Summer Paralympics at the 2014 Asian Para-Games, losing the gold medal match in sets of 25–12, 25–20, 29–27 against China men's national sitting volleyball team.

Women
Iran women's national sitting volleyball team qualified for the 2016 Summer Paralympics after reaching the finals of the 2014 Asian Para Games, the first time the women's team had qualified for the Paralympics. They won the event, after beating China who had previously qualified for the 2016 Games at the world championships earlier in the year in sets of 25–15, 25–12, and 25–15. Maleki Zeinab Dizicheh was one of the team's key players in the tournament. In the year before the Games, the team trained in Isfahan, where there were 20 members at camp along with players from the junior national team. Warm up events for the team include the March 2015 Intercontinental Cup.

Wheelchair basketball

The Iran men's national wheelchair basketball team has qualified for the 2016 Rio Paralympics. During the draw, Brazil had the choice of which group they wanted to be in. They were partnered with Spain, who would be in the group Brazil did not select. Brazil chose Group B, which included Iran, the United States, Great Britain, Germany and Algeria. That left Spain in Group A with Australia, Canada, Turkey, the Netherlands and Japan.

See also
Iran at the 2016 Summer Olympics

References

Nations at the 2016 Summer Paralympics
2016
2016 in Iranian sport